The Key Management Interoperability Protocol (KMIP) is an extensible communication protocol that defines message formats for the manipulation of cryptographic keys on a key management server. This facilitates data encryption by simplifying encryption key management. Keys may be created on a server and then retrieved, possibly wrapped by other keys. Both symmetric and asymmetric keys are supported, including the ability to sign certificates. KMIP also allows for clients to ask a server to encrypt or decrypt data, without needing direct access to the key.

The KMIP standard was first released in 2010. Clients and servers are commercially available from multiple vendors. The KMIP standard effort is governed by the OASIS standards body. Technical details can also be found on the official KMIP page and kmip wiki.

Description
A KMIP server stores and controls Managed Objects like symmetric and asymmetric keys, certificates, and user defined objects. Clients then use the protocol for accessing these objects subject to a security model that is implemented by the servers. Operations are provided to create, locate, retrieve and update managed objects.

Each managed object comprises an immutable Value like a key-block containing a cryptographic-key. These objects comprise mutable Attributes which can be used for storing metadata about their keys. Some attributes are derived directly from the Value, like the cryptographic-algorithm and key-length. Other attributes are defined in the specification for the management of objects like the Application-Specific Identifier which is usually derived from tape-identification data. Additional identifiers can be defined by the server or client per application need.

Each object is identified by a unique and immutable object-identifier generated by the server and is used for getting object-values. Managed-objects may also be given a number of mutable yet globally unique Name attribute which can be used for Locating objects.

Objects 
The types of managed-objects being managed by KMIP include:
 Symmetric-Keys used for algorithms like AES.
 Public and Private Keys used for asymmetric-algorithms like RSA and ECDH. Separate objects are used for storing the public and private key, thus a user may have permission to access one but not the other.  Related objects usually contain Link attributes containing the other object's unique identifier.
 Certificates and PGP Keys.
 Split Keys, with each split being a distinct object that can be managed independently from the other splits.
 Secret Data, such as passwords.
 Opaque Data for client and server defined extensions.
 Certificate Signing Requests.

Operations 
The operations provided by KMIP include:
 Create, creating a new managed object such as a symmetric key, and return the identifier.
 Create Key Pair, creating two objects that represent asymmetric keys.
 Get, retrieving an object's value given its unique identifier.  The returned value may be wrapped (encrypted) with another key that is on the server for additional security.
 Register, storing an externally generated key value.
 Add Attributes, Get Attributes, Modify Attributes and Set Attribute.  These can be used to manipulate mutable attributes of a managed object.
 Locate, retrieving a list of objects based on a predicates.
 Re-Key, creating a new key that can replace an existing key.  There are also attributes that can be used to have the server automatically rotate keys after a given period or number of uses.  The Name is moved to the new key and is normally used to retrieve a key for protection operations such as encrypt and sign.  The old key can also be retrieved using the Unique Identifier for process operations such as decryption and signature verification.
 (Re-)Certify - certifies a certificate.
 Split and Join N of M keys.
 Encrypt, Decrypt, MAC etc. Cryptographic operations performed on the key management server. A key itself could be marked being not-Extractable, in which case its value never leaves the server.
 Export and Import keys to and from other KMIP servers.
 Operations to implement the NIST key life cycle.

Key life cycle 
Each key has a cryptographic state defined by the National Institute of Standards and Technology (NIST). Keys are created in an Initial state, and must be Activated before they can be used. Keys may then be Deactivated and eventually Destroyed. A key may also be marked being Compromised.

Operations are provided for manipulating Key-state in conformance with the NIST life-cycle guidelines. A Key-state may be interrogated using the State attribute or the attributes that record dates of each transformation such as Activation Date. Dates can be specified into the future thus keys automatically become unavailable for specified operations when they expire.

Message structure
KMIP is a stateless protocol in which messages are sent from a client to a server and then the client normally awaits on a reply. Each request may contain many operations thus enables the protocol to efficiently handle large numbers of keys.  There are also advanced features for processing requests asynchronously.

The KMIP protocol specifies several different types of encodings.  The main one is a type–length–value encoding of messages, called TTLV (tag, type, length, value). Nested TTLV structures allow for encoding of complex, multi-operation messages in a single binary message.

There are also well defined XML and JSON encodings of the protocol for environments where binary is not appropriate.  A very compact CBOR encoding is also provided for applications that require it.

All of these protocols are expected to be transmitted using TLS protocol in order to ensure integrity and security.  However, it is also possible to register and retrieve keys that are wrapped (encrypted) using another key on the server, which provides an additional level of security.

System management
KMIP provides standardized mechanisms to manage a KMIP server by suitably authorized administrative clients using System Objects.  

User objects can be created and authorized to perform specific operations on specific managed objects.  Both Managed Objects and Users can be assigned to groups, and those groups can form a hierarchy which facilitates efficient management of complex operating environments.

KMIP also provides a provisioning system that facilitates providing end points with credentials using simple one time passwords.

Default values of attributes can be provided, so that simple clients need not specify cryptographic and other parameters.  For example, an administrative user might specify that all "SecretAgent" keys should be 192 bit  AES keys with  CBC block chaining.  A client then only needs to specify that they wish to create a "SecretAgent" key to have those defaults provided.  It is also possible to enforce constraints on key parameters that implement security policy.

KMIP profiles
KMIP also defines a set of profiles, which are subsets of the KMIP specification showing common usage for a particular context. A particular KMIP implementation is said to be conformant to a profile when it fulfills all the requirements set forth in a profile specification document. OASIS has put forth various profiles describing the requirements for compliance towards storage arrays and tape libraries, but any organization can create a profile.

Relationship to PKCS#11
PKCS#11 is a C API used to control a hardware security module. PKCS#11 provides cryptographic operations to encrypt and decrypt, as well as operations for simple key management. There is considerable amount of overlap between the PKCS#11 API and the KMIP protocol.

The two standards were originally developed independently. PKCS#11 was created by RSA Security, but the standard is now also governed by an OASIS technical committee. It is the stated objective of both the PKCS#11 and KMIP committees to align the standards where practical. For example, the PKCS#11 Sensitive and Extractable attributes are being added to KMIP version 1.4. Many of the same people are on the technical committees of both KMIP and PKCS#11.

KMIP 2.0 provides a standardized mechanism to transport PKCS#11 messages from clients to servers.  This can be used to target different PKCS#11 implementations without the need to recompile the programs that use it.

KMIP implementations 

The OASIS KMIP Technical Committee maintains a list of known KMIP implementations, which can be found on the OASIS website. As of March 2017, there are 28 implementations and 61 KMIP products in this list.

Interoperability between implementations
The KMIP standard is defined using a formal specification document, testcases, and profiles put forth by the OASIS KMIP technical committee. These documents are publicly available on the OASIS website.

Vendors demonstrate interoperability during a process organized by the OASIS KMIP technical committee in the months before each RSA security conference. These demonstrations are informally known as interops. KMIP interops have been held every year since 2010. The following chart shows the number of individual tests performed by each client and server vendor combination since 2012.

Example
The following shows the XML encoding of a request to Locate a key named "MyKeyName" and return its value wrapped in a different key with ID "c6d14516-4d38-0644-b810-1913b9aef4da".  (TTLV is a more common wire protocol, but XML is more human readable.)

<RequestMessage>
  <RequestHeader>
    <ProtocolVersion>
      <ProtocolVersionMajor type="Integer" value="3"/>
      <ProtocolVersionMinor type="Integer" value="0"/>
    </ProtocolVersion>
  </RequestHeader>
  <BatchItem>
    <Operation type="Enumeration" value="Locate"/>
    <UniqueBatchItemID type="ByteString" value="1"/>
    <RequestPayload>
      <Attributes>
        <Name type="TextString" value="MyKeyName"/>
      </Attributes>
    </RequestPayload>
  </BatchItem>
  <BatchItem>
    <Operation type="Enumeration" value="Get"/>
    <UniqueBatchItemID type="ByteString" value="2"/>
    <RequestPayload>
      <KeyWrappingSpecification>
        <WrappingMethod type="Enumeration" value="Encrypt"/>
        <EncryptionKeyInformation>
          <UniqueIdentifier type="Integer" value="c6d14516-4d38-0644-b810-1913b9aef4da"/>
        </EncryptionKeyInformation>
      </KeyWrappingSpecification>
    </RequestPayload>
  </BatchItem>
</RequestMessage>

Documentation
Documentation is freely available from the OASIS website. This includes the formal technical specification and a usage guide to assist people that are unfamiliar with the specification. A substantial library of test cases is also provided. These are used to test the interoperability of clients and servers, but they also provide concrete examples of the usage of each standard KMIP feature.

Version history

See also
 IEEE P1619 Security in Storage Working Group

References

External links
 
 

Cryptographic protocols
Key management
Public key infrastructure
Disk encryption
Cloud infrastructure
Computer data storage
Backup